Kasuya Yamada
  Tatsuya Yamaguchi
  Yousuke Yamakawa
  Takayoshi Yamamoto
  Takehiro Yamamoto
  Youichi Yamamoto
  Gosuke Yamashita
  Isao Yamashita
  Kazuaki Yamashita
  Fuyuki Yamazaki
  Shunji Yatsushiro
  Ryuji Yokoe
  Toshimi Yorino
  Kenichi Yoshida
  Wataru Yoshikawa
  Lewis Young
  Paul Young
  Yasuharu Yuzawa
  Shahrol Yuzy

 Y